Kylie Ann Pentelow (born 29 June 1979) is an English journalist and television news presenter. She is a presenter of ITV News West Country and the ITV Weekend News.

Education and career
Pentelow was educated at the Sir Christopher Hatton School in Wellingborough, Northamptonshire.  After graduating from the University of Sheffield with an MA in journalism, her first post was as a reporter for the Bath Chronicle. She then joined BBC Points West as a video journalist, and after joining the BBC graduate training scheme undertook postings in BBC local radio in Oxford and Birmingham, before moving back to television with the BBC News Channel. She then became a reporter/presenter for BBC East Midlands Today.

Pentelow then moved to ITV becoming the North America news correspondent for the ITV Breakfast programme Daybreak, where she was primarily based in New York City. In July 2013, she became a co-presenter of the ITV West Country regional news programme ITV News West Country. On 3 May 2014 she made her debut presenting the ITV Weekend News for ITN. In August 2017, she presented How Safe is a Sun Tan?: Tonight on ITV.

On 4 February 2019 she began fronting Wales at Six for ITV Cymru Wales, on a year long secondment.

From 3 March 2020 she co-presented a 4 part series  Dr Ranj On Call  on ITV.

In April 2021 and May 2021 she made her debut presenting the ITV Lunchtime News and the ITV Evening News respectively.

Personal life
She lives in Bristol with her husband, YouTuber and podcaster Brady Haran. They have one son and a Chihuahua named Audrey. She owns a classic 1970 Carlight caravan, on which she created a self-produced YouTube-chronicled restoration series.

References

External links

Official website

1979 births
Living people
People from Northampton
Alumni of the University of Sheffield
ITV regional newsreaders and journalists